Oskar David "Oskari" Friman (27 January 1893 – 19 October 1933) was a Greco-Roman wrestler from Finland. He won gold medals in lightweight categories at the 1920 and 1924 Olympics and 1921 World Championships. Nationally he collected eleven Finnish titles, in 1915-1924 and 1928.

Friman took up wrestling in 1908, and by 1915 became one of the best Finnish lightweight wrestlers, together with his clubmate Emil Väre. Because of World War I, he started competing internationally only at the 1920 Olympics, where he dropped to featherweight to avoid meeting Väre. Väre retired soon after that, and Friman returned to lightweight. During those years he worked as a butcher and tinsmith, but later, when he became famous and retired from competitions, he was hired as head coach of the Finnish and Swedish national wrestling teams.

References

1893 births
1933 deaths
People from Vyborg District
People from Viipuri Province (Grand Duchy of Finland)
Olympic wrestlers of Finland
Wrestlers at the 1920 Summer Olympics
Wrestlers at the 1924 Summer Olympics
Finnish male sport wrestlers
Olympic gold medalists for Finland
Olympic medalists in wrestling
Medalists at the 1920 Summer Olympics
Medalists at the 1924 Summer Olympics
World Wrestling Championships medalists
Finnish wrestling coaches